In baseball, a pinch runner is a player substituted for the specific purpose of replacing another player on base.  The pinch runner may be faster or otherwise more skilled at base-running than the player for whom the pinch runner has been substituted. Occasionally a pinch runner is inserted for other reasons (such as a double switch, ejection, or if the original player on base has become injured, such as having been hit by a pitch).

A pinch runner is not credited with a game played for the purpose of consecutive game streaks, per Rule 10.24(c) of baseball's Official Rules. For example, in May 1984, Alfredo Griffin of the Toronto Blue Jays scored the winning run in a game, yet his consecutive game streak ended as he appeared only as a pinch runner.

As with other substitutions in baseball, when a player is pinch run for, that player is removed from the game.  The pinch runner may remain in the game or be substituted for at the manager's discretion.  Earlier in baseball history, teams would occasionally use "courtesy runners" as well as pinch runners. A baserunner that had to leave the game temporarily due to injury would be replaced by a courtesy runner. The courtesy runner could leave the game and re-enter later, or could be a player already in the game playing a different position.  The player who had to leave the game was free to return to play. The last use of a courtesy runner in Major League Baseball was in 1949. Rule 3.04 of baseball's Official Rules now forbids courtesy runners.

One of the most famous pinch runners was Herb Washington of the Oakland Athletics.  Oakland owner Charlie Finley, known as an unconventional thinker, came to believe that it would be useful to have a "designated runner"—a fast player on the roster whose only job was to periodically enter a game and run the bases for slower players.  He signed Washington, a track star with no baseball experience.  Washington appeared in 105 games for the Athletics in 1974 and 1975, scoring 33 runs and stealing 31 bases, without once playing the field or coming up to bat. His 1975 Topps baseball card is the only baseball card in history to use the "Pinch Runner" position label.

For statistical and scorekeeping purposes, the pinch runner is denoted by PR.

History
After organized professional baseball was started with the National League in 1876, the National League changed a rule in 1878 so that pinch runners were not allowed except in cases of illness or injury with the substitute entering the game after the original player reached base.

See also
 Pinch hitter

References

External links
List of all known instances of courtesy runners

Baseball positions
Baseball terminology